Malaya competed in the 1959 Southeast Asian Peninsular Games held in Bangkok, Thailand from 12 to 17 December 1959.

Medal summary

Medals by sport

Medallists

References

1959